Francis Bond may refer to:

Francis Godolphin Bond (1765–1839), rear-admiral
Sir Francis George Bond (1856–1930), British soldier and amateur football player
Francis Bond (governor) on List of governors of Barbados

See also
Frank Bond (disambiguation)
Francis Bond Head (1793–1875), Lieutenant-Governor of Upper Canada